Skatterättsnämnden (English: Council for Advance Tax Rulings) is a Swedish government agency. It is part of the Ministry of Finance and it is responsible for providing legally binding advance tax rulings in response to tax questions.

References

Government agencies of Sweden